Ten ships of the Royal Navy have borne the name HMS Alarm, whilst another was planned but later cancelled:

  was a 32-gun fifth rate frigate, launched in 1758.  She was the first Royal Navy ship to have a fully copper sheathed hull.  She was broken up in 1812.
  was a 4-gun cutter purchased in 1763 and sold in 1780.
  was a galley purchased in 1777 and scuttled to avoid capture in July 1778.
  was a 24-gun sixth rate captured from the Dutch in 1799, and renamed Helder and then Heldin in 1800 and sold in 1802.
  was a lugger of eight carronades transferred from Customs in 1810 and returned to Customs in 1812 or 1813.
HMS Alarm was to be a 28-gun sixth rate laid down in 1832 and cancelled later that year.
  was a 28-gun sixth rate launched in 1845. She was converted into a coal hulk in 1860 and sold in 1904.
  was the former Saint-class naval tug Saint Ewe built in 1919 and hired from the Iraqi Government in 1940 as a minesweeper; renamed Alarm II in 1942 and returned in 1946.
  was an  launched in 1942, damaged by German aircraft in 1943, and declared a constructive total loss. She was scrapped in 1944.

References

Royal Navy ship names